Athleague Hurling Club is a hurling club located in Athleague, County Roscommon, Ireland. They were founded in 1901; soon after, they challenged a team from Athlone.

Their grounds, Waldron Park, are often used by Roscommon hurling team.

Their current manager is Padraig Mannion.

A camogie team was founded in 1979.

Honours

 Roscommon Senior Hurling Championship (19): 1908, 1909, 1910, 1916, 1928, 1929, 1937, 1947, 1949, 1953, 1955, 1957, 1959, 1975, 1978, 2003, 2006, 2007, 2018,2021
 All-Ireland Junior Club Camogie Championship Runner-Up 2015
 Connacht Senior Club Hurling Championship: Runners-Up 1975, 2003, 2006

References

External links
Athleague GAA site (archived)

Gaelic games clubs in County Roscommon
Hurling clubs in County Roscommon